Atta Muhammad Marri (1937–1998) was a Sindhi politician hailing from a political agricultural family of Sindh. His father Ali Muhammad Marri was an influential politician of his time and remained a member of the Legislative Assembly during the British Raj, as well as the Sindh President of the Khilafat Movement.

Atta Muhammad Marri remained a Member of the West Pakistan Assembly in 1967, and Member of the National Assembly of Pakistan in the 1970s and 1980s, a member of the Majlis-e-Shura during Zia ul Haq's time, and the Deputy Speaker of the Sindh Assembly from 1990 to 1993.

Atta Muhammad Marri died on March 2, 1998. His daughter Shazia Marri is a Member National Assembly, Currently.

See also
 Sindh Assembly
 Shazia Marri

References

Sindh MPAs 1990–1993
1937 births
1998 deaths
Deputy Speakers of the Provincial Assembly of Sindh